Lees Creek is a stream in Highland, Fayette and Clinton counties, Ohio, in the United States.

Lees Creek was named for Peter Lee, a government surveyor.

Location
Mouth: Confluence with Rattlesnake Creek, Highland County 
Source: Clinton County east of Wilmington

See also
List of rivers of Ohio

References

Rivers of Clinton County, Ohio
Rivers of Fayette County, Ohio
Rivers of Highland County, Ohio
Rivers of Ohio